Elections to Lancaster City Council were held on 2 May 2019 at the same time as other 2019 United Kingdom local elections. Local elections are held every four years with all councillors up for election in multi-member electoral wards.

Council composition 
Prior to the election the composition of the council was:

The 2015 election returned no overall control, but a series of defections and by-election wins have maintained a majority for the Labour Party afterwards. The composition of the Council immediately after the last election was:

Following the 2019 election, the council was returned with No Overall Control.

Election results

Ward results

Bare

Bolton and Slyne

Bulk

Carnforth and Millhead

Castle

Ellel

Halton-with-Aughton

Harbour

Heysham Central

Heysham North

Heysham South

John O'Gaunt

Kellet

Lower Lune Valley

Marsh

Overton

Poulton

Scotforth East

Scotforth West

Silverdale

Skerton East

Skerton West

Torrisholme

University and Scotforth Rural

Upper Lune Valley

Warton

Westgate

By-elections

Overton

Bulk

Kellet

University & Scotforth Rural

Carnforth & Millhead

Bare

Upper Lune Valley

Ellel

Harbour

Warton

References 

Lancaster
2019
May 2019 events in the United Kingdom
2010s in Lancashire